Chamaca (Quechua: Chamaqa; Aymara: Ch'amaka, meaning, dark or darkness) is one of eight districts of the Chumbivilcas Province in Peru.

Geography 
Other mountains are listed below:

Ethnic groups 
The people in the district are mainly indigenous citizens of Quechua descent. Quechua is the language which the majority of the population (93.64%) learnt to speak in childhood, 6.12% of the residents started speaking using the Spanish language (2007 Peru Census).

See also 
 T'ikapallana

References